Events in the year 2022 in Bermuda.

Incumbents 

 Monarch: Elizabeth II (until 8 September); Charles III onwards
 Governor: Rena Lalgie
 Premier: Edward David Burt

Events 

 22 July – Bermuda reports its first case of monkeypox.
 21 September – Hurricane Fiona reached Category 4 as it moved from the Turks and Caicos Islands toward Bermuda.
 4 October – Bermuda is removed from the European Union's tax haven blacklist,

Sports 

 18 June – 3 July: Bermuda at the 2022 World Aquatics Championships
 15 July – 24 July: Bermuda at the 2022 World Athletics Championships
 28 July – 8 August: Bermuda at the 2022 Commonwealth Games

Deaths 

 24 April – Freddy Hall, 37, Bermudian footballer (Telford United, Limerick, national team)

References 

 
2010s in Bermuda
Years of the 21st century in Bermuda
Bermuda
Bermuda